Kandula Lakshmi Durgesh Prasad better known as Kandula Durgesh is an Indian Politician. He is a member of Andhra Pradesh Legislative Council for a term from 2007-2013 representing Indian National Congress. He also contested the 2019 assembly election (2019 Andhra Pradesh Legislative Assembly election), in Rajahmundry Rural (Assembly constituency) representing Jana Sena Party defeated in the election polling but secured 42,685 votes in his favour.

References

Telugu politicians
People from East Godavari district
Year of birth missing (living people)
Living people
Indian National Congress politicians from Andhra Pradesh
Jana Sena Party politicians